The Morocco women's national football team is the representative women's association football team of Morocco . Its governing body is the Royal Moroccan Football Federation (RMFF) and it competes as a member of the Confederation of African Football (CAF)

Legend

1998

2000

2006

2007

2011

2012

2014

2018

2020

2021

2022

2023

References

Women's national association football team results
Women's football in Morocco
Morocco national football team